Gord Stafford  (born October 10, 1960) is a Canadian former professional ice hockey player.

Stafford played major junior hockey with the Billings Bighorns of the Western Hockey League (WHL). He attended a try-out with the Edmonton Oilers of the National Hockey League prior to the start of the 1979–80 season, but was released to play out his final year of junior eligibility with the Bighorns.

He went on to play professionally for seven seasons, predominantly with the Milwaukee Admirals of the International Hockey League (IHL), where he scored 131 goals and 219 assists for 350 points, while earning 228 penalty minutes, in 355 games played, before hanging up his skates following the 1986–87 IHL season.

Family
His son, Drew Stafford, is currently on a professional tryout with the Minnesota Wild of the National Hockey League.

References

External links

1960 births
Living people
Billings Bighorns players
Canadian ice hockey centres
Milwaukee Admirals players
Wichita Wind players
People from Banff, Alberta
Ice hockey people from Alberta